The FAW Senia R7 is a subcompact CUV produced by Chinese car manufacturer Senia (森雅) under the FAW Jilin subsidiary of FAW Group.

Overview
The Senia R7 five-seater crossover was manufactured by FAW-Jilin, a FAW subsidiary based in Jilin Province. The CUV is almost identical to the later introduced Besturn X40 based on the same platform.

The FAW Senia R7 crossover SUV has been through four names across different FAW brands during its development process including the FAW R020, the FAW R20, and the Junpai D80.

Powertrain
The Senia R7 powertrain offers an option of 1.6-liter and 1.5-liter turbo engines, with maximum power figures of  respectively. The engines are mated to a 5-speed manual transmission or 6-speed automatic transmission.

2018 facelift
During the 2018 Beijing Auto Show, the Senia R7 City was revealed previewing a direction for the upcoming facelift.

References

External links
Senia R7 Official site
Senia R7 zhineng Official site

2010s cars
Cars introduced in 2016
Cars of China
Crossover sport utility vehicles
R7
Front-wheel-drive vehicles
Mini sport utility vehicles